This list includes stratigraphic units and structural geologic features in Massachusetts, grouped by age and by region within the state.

Stratigraphic Units

Eastern Massachusetts

Proterozoic
 Mattapan Volcanic Complex
 Lynn Volcanic Complex
 Middlesex Fells Volcanic Complex

Cambrian
 Hoppin Formation
 Greenlodge Formation
 Weymouth Formation

Silurian-Devonian
 Newbury Volcanic Complex

Pennsylvanian (Late Carboniferous)
 Bellingham Conglomerate
 Narragansett Bay Group

Structural Geologic Features

Eastern Massachusetts
Basins, Zones, Troughs & Blocks
 Bellingham Basin
 Boston Basin
 Burlington mylonite zone
 Middleton Basin
 Nantucket Basin
 Narragansett Basin
 Nashoba Zone
 Nashua trough
 Newbury Volcanic Zone
 Norfolk Basin

Faults
 Bloody Bluff fault
 Clinton-Newbury fault

References

Geologic formations of Massachusetts